Nikolay Ivanov (born January 17, 1957, Kursk) is a Russian political figure and a deputy of the 3rd, 6th, 7th, and 8th State Dumas.
 
From 1979 to 1981, Ivanov served at the Soviet Army. From 1981 to 1987, he served as an instructor and then as head of the department of the Kursk Regional Committee of the Komsomol. From 1997 to 1998, he was the Deputy Chairman of the Governor of Kursk Oblast Alexander Rutskoy. In December 1996, he was elected to the Kursk Oblast Duma. From 1999 to 2003, he was the deputy of the 3rd State Duma. In 2006 and 2011, he was elected to the Kursk Oblast Duma of the 4th and 5th convocations. He left the post to become deputy of the 6th State Duma. In 2016 and 2021, he was re-elected for the 7th, and 8th State Dumas.

References
 

 

1957 births
Living people
Communist Party of the Russian Federation members
21st-century Russian politicians
Eighth convocation members of the State Duma (Russian Federation)
Seventh convocation members of the State Duma (Russian Federation)
Sixth convocation members of the State Duma (Russian Federation)
Third convocation members of the State Duma (Russian Federation)
Politicians from Kursk